The House of Representatives (pronounced ; commonly referred to as the , literally "Second Chamber of the States General") is the lower house of the bicameral parliament of the Netherlands, the States General, the other one being the Senate. It has 150 seats, which are filled through elections using party-list proportional representation. Generally, the house is located in the Binnenhof in The Hague, however, it has temporarily moved to the former building of the Ministry of Foreign Affairs at Bezuidenhoutseweg 67 in the Hague while the Binnenhof is being renovated.

Name
Although the body is officially called the "House of Representatives" in English, it is not a direct translation of its official Dutch name, the "Second Chamber of the States General", "Second Chamber" or more colloquially just the "Chamber". Rather than "representative" (afgevaardigde), a member of the House is referred to as (Tweede) Kamerlid, or "member of the (Second) Chamber".

Functions

The House of Representatives is the main legislative body of the States General, where discussions of proposed legislation and review of the actions of the cabinet take place. Both the Cabinet and the House of Representatives itself have the right to propose legislation; the House of Representatives discusses it and, if adopted by a majority, sends it on to the Senate. Review of the actions of the cabinet takes the form of formal interrogations, which may result in motions urging the cabinet to take, or refrain from, certain actions. No individual may be a member of both parliament and cabinet, except in a caretaker cabinet that has not yet been succeeded when a new House is sworn in.

The House of Representatives is also responsible for the first round of selection for judges to the Supreme Court of the Netherlands. It submits a list of three names for every vacant position to the Government. Furthermore, it elects the Dutch Ombudsman and their subsidiaries.

Elections
The normal term of the House of Representatives is four years. Elections are called when the government loses the parliament's confidence, the governing coalition breaks down, the term of the House of Representatives expires or when no governing coalition can be formed.

Parties

Anyone eligible to vote in the Netherlands also has the right to establish a political party and contest in elections for the House of Representatives. Parties wanting to take part must register 43 days before the elections, supplying a nationwide list of no more than 50 candidates (80 if the party already has more than 15 seats). Parties that do not have any sitting candidates in the House of Representatives must also pay a deposit (11,250 euro for the March 2021 elections, for all districts together) and provide 30 signatures of support from residents of each of the 20 electoral districts in which they want to collect votes.

Party lists
Candidate lists are given to voters at least 14 days before the election. Each candidate list is numbered, with the candidate in the first position being known as the lijsttrekker ("list puller"). The lijsttrekker is usually appointed by the party to lead its election campaign, and is almost always the party's political leader and candidate for Prime Minister. Parties may choose to compete with different candidate lists in each of the 20 electoral districts, but as seats are allocated on a national rather than district level, most parties have almost identical lists in all districts with candidates running. Only large parties usually have some regional candidates at the bottom of their lists. From 1973 until its abolition in June 2017 it was possible for two or more parties to combine their separate lists to increase the chance of winning a remainder seat. This was known as a 'list combination' or Lijstverbinding / lijstencombinatie.

Registration and voting
Citizens of the Kingdom of the Netherlands aged 18 and over have the right to vote, with the exception of 1) prisoners serving a term of more than one year, 2) those who have been declared incapable by court because of insanity, 3) residents of Aruba, Curaçao and Sint Maarten, unless they have spent ten years residing in the Netherlands or work for the Dutch civil service. Eligible citizens residing in the Netherlands are able to vote if they are registered in a municipal population register (Basisregistratie Personen). Eligible citizens living outside of the Netherlands can permanently register to vote at the municipality of The Hague, provided they have a current Dutch passport or identity card.

A single vote can be placed on any one candidate. Many voters select one of the lijsttrekkers (Jan Peter Balkenende, for example, received 2,198,114 of the CDA's 2,608,573 votes in the November 2006 elections), but alternatively may give a preference vote for a candidate lower down the list.

Allocation of seats
Once the votes have been counted, the seats are allocated to the parties. The number of valid national votes cast is divided by 150, the number of seats available, to give a threshold for each seat (the kiesdeler); 1/150th is approximately 0.67% of the valid votes. Each party's number of votes is divided by this threshold, and rounded down to the nearest whole number, to give an initial number of seats equal to the number of times the threshold was reached. Any party that received fewer votes than the threshold fails to gain representation in the House of Representatives. After the initial seats are allocated, the remainder seats are allocated among the parties that received at least one seat, using the D'Hondt method of largest averages. This system slightly favours the larger parties. Since parties that received fewer votes than required to obtain one whole seat are not eligible for remainder seats, there is a de facto election threshold of 0.67%. This threshold is one of the lowest for national parliaments in the world, and there are usually multiple parties winning seats with 2% or less of the vote. Any party that did not have seats in the House at the time of the election will have its deposit refunded if it receives more than 75% of the threshold (1/200th of the vote).

Once the number of seats allocated to each party is known, they are usually allocated to candidates in the order that they appear on the party's list. (Hence, before the elections, the candidates near the top may be described as in an electable position, depending on the number of seats that the party is likely to obtain.) At this stage, however, the preference votes are also taken into account. Any candidate receiving more than one quarter of the threshold on personal preference votes (the 'preference threshold' or voorkeursdrempel, 0.1675% of the total number of valid votes), is considered elected in their own right, leapfrogging candidates higher on the list. After the November 2006 elections, only one candidate received a seat exclusively through preference votes, while the 26 other candidates who reached the preference threshold were already elected based on their position on the list. If a candidate cannot take up the position in parliament (e.g., if they become a minister, decide not to enter parliament, or later resign) then the next candidate on the list takes their place.

Formation of governing coalition
After all seats are allocated, a series of negotiations take place in order to form a government that, usually, commands a majority in the chamber. Since 2012, the House of Representatives appoints a "scout" to ask the major party leaders about prospective coalitions. On basis of the scout's interviews, the House of Representatives then appoints an informateur, who checks out possible coalitions, and formateur, who leads negotiations (before 2012, the informateur and formateur were appointed by the monarch). It typically takes a few months before the formateur is ready to accept a royal invitation to form a government and become prime minister. All cabinet members must resign from parliament, as the constitution does not allow a cabinet member to simultaneously hold a seat in the House of Representatives.

Due to the nationwide party-list system and the low election threshold, a typical House of Representatives has ten or more factions represented. Such fragmentation makes it nearly impossible for one party to win the 76 seats needed for a majority in the House of Representatives. Since the current party-list proportional representation system was introduced in 1918, no party has reached the number of seats that are theoretically required to govern alone or win enough for an outright majority. The highest amount of seats won by a single party since then has been 54 out of 150, by the CDA in 1986 and 1989. Between 1891 and 1897, the Liberal Union was the last party to have an absolute majority of seats in the House of Representatives. All Dutch cabinets since then have been coalitions of two or more parties.

Composition

Historical compositions

Historically, there have been 100 seats in the House of Representatives. In 1956, this number was increased to 150, at which it remains today.

To give an overview of the history of the House of Representatives, the figure on the right shows the seat distribution in the House from the first general elections after World War II (1946) to the most recent election. The left-wing parties are located towards the bottom, while the Christian parties are located in the centre, and the right-wing parties towards the top. Occasionally, single-issue (or narrow-focus) parties have arisen, and these are shown at the extreme top. Vertical lines indicate general elections. Although these are generally held every four years, the resulting coalition governments do not always finish their term without a government crisis, which is often followed by new elections.

Current composition

The general election of 2021 was held on Wednesday, 17 March 2021.

Unrepresented vote
The small fraction of voters, which were not represented by any party in the House of Representatives of the Netherlands despite valid vote, is increasing. The unrepresented vote fraction is shown below:

Parliamentary leaders

Members of the Presidium

Parliamentary Committees

Notes

References

External links

 
  Official site
 Virtual tour of the houses of parliament
  Seat allocation in the House of Representatives. Click the diagram on the left to see names and photos of all representatives per section. 
  Official site for archives since 1995

 
States General of the Netherlands
Dutch political institutions
High Councils of State
Netherlands
Organisations based in The Hague

tk:Wekiller palatasy (Gollandiýa)